Andre Neblett (born June 7, 1988) is an former American football defensive tackle who played four seasons in the National Football League (NFL). He played college football at Temple and was signed by the Carolina Panthers as an undrafted free agent in 2010. He was also a member of the Tampa Bay Buccaneers and the New England Patriots.

In 2016, Neblett became involved with NASCAR, after he was selected as part of a national combine for the Drive for Diversity crew development program.

Early years
Raised in Rahway, New Jersey, Neblett played prep football as a fullback and linebacker at Rahway High School.

College career
Neblett played college football at Temple, where he started in 45 games for the Owls. He earned All-Mid-American Conference honors during his career.

Professional career

Carolina Panthers
On April 30, 2010, Neblett was signed by the Carolina Panthers as an undrafted free agent following the 2010 NFL Draft. On July 18, 2012, Neblett was informed by the NFL that he would be suspended for the first four games of the season for testing positive for performance-enhancing drugs.

Tampa Bay Buccaneers
Neblett signed with the Tampa Bay Buccaneers on May 6, 2013. On August 31, 2013, Neblett was released during the final roster cuts of the preseason.

New England Patriots
Neblett signed with the New England Patriots on October 9, 2013, but was released later that week on October 12. He was re-signed when the Patriots put linebacker Jerod Mayo on injured reserve on October 16. Neblett was released again on October 21.

References

External links
Tampa Bay Buccaneers bio
Carolina Panthers bio

1988 births
Living people
Rahway High School alumni
Sportspeople from Rahway, New Jersey
Players of American football from New Jersey
American football defensive tackles
Temple Owls football players
Carolina Panthers players
Tampa Bay Buccaneers players
New England Patriots players